Paul Walford Corder (14 December 1879 - 6 August 1942) was an English composer and music professor.

Corder was born at Pimlico, London, the son of musician Frederick Corder and his wife Henrietta Walford. He was baptised at St Gabriel's, Warwick Square, London, on  1 March 1880. He studied under his father at the Royal Academy of Music and won the Goring Thomas scholarship for composition in 1901. In 1907 he joined the staff of the Academy as Professor of Composition and Harmony.

His aunt Rosa Corder painted a portrait of Dante Gabriel Rossetti and Corder was strongly influenced by the Pre-Raphaelite movement. He composed operas, ballets, cantatas and piano works. Many of his orchestral works remain unpublished and unknown but some of his keyboard pieces were published and achieved some public attention.  He was a close friend of Arnold Bax with whom he spent holidays in Cornwall. Bax dedicated the song "Aspiration" (1909) and his Fourth Symphony (1931) to Corder.

Paul and his sister Dolly moved to Looe Island, Cornwall in 1921, the island being bought with the proceeds  of the sale of Frederick Corder's  collection of first editions. It is said that Dolly was so distraught at Paul's death in 1942 that she destroyed many of his musical manuscripts.

From 1932 Corder lived for many years at White Cottage, Netley Heath, Surrey, with his sister Dolly. One of his hobbies was furniture-making.

Works 

Rapunzel, Opera
Grettir the Strong, Opera
The Dryad, Ballet
A Song of Battle for choir and orchestra
A Song of the Ford for male choir and orchestra 
Four Sea Songs for baritone and orchestra
The Moonslave, a terpsichorean fantasy
A Song of the Bottle
Spanish Waters
Sunset and Sunrise
Pelleas and Melisande
Cyrano de Bergerac, overture
Gaelic Fantasy
Morar 
Dross, Music drama without words
Violin concerto 
Five Orchestral Tone Pictures: : Along the Seashore: 1. The Ebbing Tide; 2. The Sea Cavern; 3. Seagull's Rock; 4. The still hour of dusk; 5. The Call of the Sea
String quartet
Fountains for viola and piano 
Transmutations of an Original Theme for piano
Nine Preludes for piano
Three Studies
Passacaglia
Romantic Study
Heroic Elegy
Spanish Waters
An Autumn Memory

References

External links

1879 births
1942 deaths
Alumni of the Royal Academy of Music
Academics of the Royal Academy of Music
English classical composers
20th-century classical composers
English male classical composers
20th-century English composers
20th-century British male musicians